The 2014–15 Telekom S-League was the 11th season of the Telekom S-League in the Solomon Islands. Western United won the championship for the first time and also qualified as the Solomon Islands representative for the 2014–15 OFC Champions League. All matches were played at the hillside ground called Lawson Tama Stadium, with an approximate capacity of 20,000.

Teams 
 Hana (Honiara)
 Koloale FC (Honiara)
 Kossa FC (Honiara)
 Malaita Kingz FC (Malaita)
 Marist Fire (Honiara)
 Real Kakamora FC (Makira-Ulawa)
 Solomon Warriors (Honiara)
 Western United (Western)
 X-Beam (Honiara)

Standings

References 

Solomon Islands S-League seasons
Solomon
Solomon
football
football